Baker Township, Kansas may refer to:

 Baker Township, Crawford County, Kansas
 Baker Township, Gove County, Kansas

See also 
 List of Kansas townships
 Baker Township (disambiguation)

Kansas township disambiguation pages